In discrete geometry, a -set of a finite point set  in the Euclidean plane is a subset of  elements of  that can be strictly separated from the remaining points by a line. More generally, in Euclidean space of higher dimensions, a -set of a finite point set is a subset of  elements that can be separated from the remaining points by a hyperplane.

The -sets of a set of points in the plane are related by projective duality to the -levels in an arrangement of lines. The -level in an arrangement of  lines in the plane is the curve consisting of the points that lie on one of the lines and have exactly  lines below them. Discrete and computational geometers have also studied levels in arrangements of more general kinds of curves and surfaces.

Combinatorial bounds 

It is of importance in the analysis of geometric algorithms to bound the number of -sets of a planar point set, or equivalently the number of -levels of a planar line arrangement, a problem first studied by Lovász and Erdős et al.

For points in three dimensions that are in convex position, that is, are the vertices of some convex polytope, the number of -sets is 
, which follows from arguments used for bounding the complexity of th order Voronoi diagrams.

For the case when  (halving lines), the maximum number of combinatorially distinct lines through two points of  that bisect the remaining points when  is

Construction algorithms 
Edelsbrunner and Welzl first studied the problem of constructing all -sets of an input point set, or dually of constructing the -level of an arrangement. The -level version of their algorithm can be viewed as a plane sweep algorithm that constructs the level in left-to-right order. Viewed in terms of -sets of point sets, their algorithm maintains a dynamic convex hull for the points on each side of a separating line, repeatedly finds a bitangent of these two hulls, and moves each of the two points of tangency to the opposite hull. Chan surveys subsequent results on this problem, and shows that it can be solved in time proportional to Dey's  bound on the complexity of the -level.

Agarwal and Matoušek describe algorithms for efficiently constructing an approximate level; that is, a curve that passes between the -level and the -level for some small approximation parameter .

Matroid generalizations 
If one graphs the weight functions as lines in a plane, the -level of the arrangement of these lines graphs as a function of  the weight of the largest element in an optimal basis in a uniform matroid, and Dey showed that his  bound on the complexity of the -level could be generalized to count the number of distinct optimal bases of any matroid with  elements and rank .

For instance, the same  upper bound holds for counting the number of different minimum spanning trees formed in a graph with  edges and  vertices, when the edges have weights that vary linearly with a parameter . This parametric minimum spanning tree problem has been studied by various authors and can be used to solve other bicriterion spanning tree optimization problems.

For more general matroids, Dey's  upper bound has a matching lower bound.

Notes

References

External links
Halving lines and -sets, Jeff Erickson
The Open Problems Project, Problem 7: -sets

Discrete geometry
Matroid theory